Terry O'Connor may refer to:
 Terry O'Connor (politician) (born 1940), Canada politician
 Terry O'Connor (musician) (1897–1983), Irish musician and teacher
 Terry O'Connor (rugby league) (born 1971), English rugby player and commentator

See also
 Tere O'Connor (born 1958), American choreographer
 Terence O'Connor (1891–1940), British politician
 Terrence O'Connor, Canadian judge